HP Pavilion is a line of consumer-oriented laptop and desktop computers produced by HP Inc. It was introduced in 1995 by Hewlett-Packard. The name is applied to both desktops and laptops for the Home and Home Office product range. The Pavilion mainly competes against computers such as Acer's Aspire, Dell's Inspiron and XPS, Lenovo's IdeaPad, Samsung's Sens and Toshiba's Satellite.

When Hewlett-Packard merged with Compaq in 2002, it took over Compaq's existing naming rights agreement, and so sold both HP and Compaq-branded machines, until 2013.

History

In 1995, HP introduced the Pavilion PC, an IBM-compatible computer of the desktop type, which marked the company's introduction into the home-computing market. Dave Packard published The HP Way, a book that chronicled the rise of Hewlett-Packard and gave consumers insight into its business practices, culture, and management style. HP also produced a low-cost, high-speed infrared transceiver that allowed wireless data exchange in a range of portable computing applications; these included telephones, computers, printers, cash registers, automatic teller machines, and digital cameras.

The first HP Pavilion PC
The HP Pavilion 5030, released in 1995 as the first computer in the HP Pavilion line, was technically HP's second multimedia PC designed specifically for the home market. The first was called the HP Multimedia PC; model numbers were 6100, 6140S, and 6170S. The Pavilion went on to become a popular model. Specifications included a quad-speed CD-ROM drive, Altec Lansing speakers, software for online service access, and came shipped with Windows 95. This entry-level model featured a 75 MHz Intel Pentium processor, 8 MB RAM and an 850 MB hard drive.

Desktops

HP offers about 30 customizable desktops; of these, 5 are standard HP Pavilion, 4 are Slimline, 6 are High Performance Edition (HPE), 5 are "Phoenix" HPE Gaming editions*, 5 are Touchsmart, and 5 are All-In-One.

Current desktop models
 HP Pavilion: p7m, p7z, p7t, p7xt, p7qe
 HP Pavilion Slimline: s5m, s5t, s5z, s5xt
 HP Pavilion HPE (High Performance Edition): h8m, h8t, h8z, h8xt, h8qe, h8se
 HP Pavilion HPE (High Performance Edition) Phoenix (Gaming): h9-1100z, h9-1120t, h9-1150t, h9-1170t, h9-1135, h9-1200ex *(not customizable)
 HP Pavilion Wave: 600t
 HP Touchsmart PC: 310z, 610z, 610t, 610xt, 610 Quad
 HP Omni Series (All-In-One): 100z, 100t, 200t, 200xt, 200 Quad

Past desktop models
(Note that this is not a complete list, but a list of more recent models.)
 HP Pavilion: a255c, a445c, a1740n, a6560t, a6560z, a6510t, a6500z, a6460t, a6450z, a6410t, a6400z, a6250z, a6250t, a6210z, a6205t, a6200t, a6600z, a6608f, a6610t, ?6617?, a6660t, a6660z, a6700z, a6750f, p6300z, p6310t, p6350z, p6370t, p6380t, a705w,
a000 series - Panther / Jaguar
a1000 series - Mojave / Gobi
a6000 / p6000 series - Venus / Venus2
 HP Pavilion Slimline: s3100n, s3200t, s3200z, s3400t, s3400z, s3500t, s3500z, s3600f, s3600t, s3600z, s3700f, s3700z, s3710t, s3750t, s5305z, s5310t, s5350z, s5370t, s5380t, s5730f, s7350n
 HP Pavilion Media Center: a1330n, a1410n, a1600n, m7580n(XP Only), m8300, m8100y, m8200n, t000,
 HP Pavilion Elite/HPE: m9350f, m9300t, m9300z, m9200t, m9200z, m9000t, m9000z, d5000z, d5000t, d5100t, m9400t, m9400z, d5200t, e9300z, HPE 110t, HPE 150t, HPE 170t, HPE 180t, HPE 190t
 HP Pavilion Ultimate: d4999t, d4999z
 HP Touchsmart: iq770t, iq772t, IQ504t, IQ506t, IQ804t, 300z, 600t, 600xt, 600 Quad
 HP Pavilion All In One/Omni: 23SE, MS220z, 200t

Model number suffixes
The suffix on the model number, if present, indicates special information such as processor or country. The following chart describes each suffix.

 t: Intel processor
 z: AMD processor
 sb: Small Business Series
 se: Special Edition
 qe: Quad Edition 
 y:  CTO - Configure To Order

Two-letter country codes such as
 us: United States
 ca: Canada
 br: Brazil
 la: Latin America
 ap: Asian Pacific
 au/ax/tu/tx: Asia/Australia
 ea/ec/ee/eo/(e plus a letter): Eastern & Western Europe
 sa/sc/se/so/(s plus a letter): Eastern & Western Europe
 na/nc/ne/no/(n plus a letter): Eastern & Western Europe
 qr: Russia

etc.

Overheating problems
The HP Pavilion Slimline desktops are housed in small form factor cases. They can become very hot because of their small size.

Notebooks

The HP Pavilion laptops are customizable in the US only. A variety of different models with different setups are available in other countries. Up until 2013, HP was producing some models of the Pavilion with Compaq Presario branding.

Current notebook models

HP Pavilion x360

HP Pavilion 13 x360

Previous notebook models
 20.1 inch: HDX9000
 18.4 inch: HDX18t / dv8t
 17.0 inch: dv7 / g70t / dv9000 / dv8000 / zd8000 / zd7000 
 16.0 inch: HP G60-445DX
 15.6 inch: Compaq Presario (CQ60 / CQ62z), dv6t / dv6z / dv6zae (Artist Edition 2) / G60t
 15.4 inch: dv5 / dv6000 / dv5000 / dv4000 / zv6000 / zv5000 / zx5000 / ze5000 / ze4000 / zt3000
 15.0 inch: ze2000 / ze1000 / zt1000
 14.3 inch: dv1658
 14.1 inch: dv4z / dv2000 series / dv1000 series
 13.3 inch: dv3t / dv3z / dv3500t
 12.1 inch: dv2z; Tablet PC: tx series / TouchSmart tx2z
 17.3 inch: ENVY 17 3D / ENVY 17 / dv7t / G72t / g7
 15.6 inch: HDX16t / G62t / G62m / g6 / m6 / 15-p077tx / 15-p001tx / 15-ck069tx 15-p005x / 15-p073tx / 15-p045tx / 15-p085tx / 15-r022tx / 15-r014tx / 15-r022tx / 15-d103tx / 15-p207tx / 15-p209tx/ 15-p210tx/ 15-p029tx/ 15-p028tx / 15-p027tx / 15-f233wm/15-n096sa/15-ab165us
 14.5 inch: ENVY 14
 14.1 inch: dv4tse / dv4t
 14.0 inch: dm4t / dm4x / G4t
 13.3 inch: dm3t / Voodoo Envy 133
 12.1 inch: tm2t
 11.6 inch: dm1z
 10.1 inch: HP Pavilion x2 Detachable (1280 x 800 touchscreen)

The HP Pavilion x2 is a long-running family of devices; there are dozens of variants, across many generations of Intel processors.

HP Mini

 10.1 inch: HP Mini 1000 (Mi / XP / Mobile Broadband Wireless / Vivienne Tam) / HP Mini 210 / HP Mini 110 (Mi / XP)
 8.9 inch: HP Mini 1000 (Mi / XP / Mobile Broadband Wireless)

Model number suffixes
The two or three letter suffix on the model number indicates special information like country or language (dv----xx). 
The following chart describes each suffix.
 t: Intel processor
 z: AMD processor
 ae: Artist Edition ("Artist Edition" imprint)
 bw: Broadband Wireless series
 sb: Small Business series
 se: Special Edition ("Intensity" dv4tse, "Renewal" dv5tse; "Special Edition" imprint)
 qe: Quad Edition (special quad-core processor, e.g. dv7tqe-6100 CTO with Intel i7)

The following suffixes corresponds to the region where the notebook is sold.
 us: United States
 ca: Canada
 la: Latin America
 br: Brazil
 ea / ee / [e + other letter]: Europe / Middle East
 eo / so / no: Scandinavia
 ec / sc / nc: Czech Republic and Slovakia
 au / ax: Asia / Australia - AMD processor (AU = AMD + UMA graphics; AX = AMD + discrete graphics)
 tu / tx: Asia / Australia - Intel processor (TU = Intel + UMA; TX = Intel + discrete)
 ap: Asia Pacific

Other suffixes include nr, cl, and wm.
 nr: no rebate
 cl: club model, available only through discount shopping clubs such as Costco and Sam's Club
 wm: Walmart model
 dx: Best Buy model
 od: Office Depot model
 st: Staples model

The HP Pavilion HDX is only sold with Intel processors, but does not end with the suffix "t"; it has no suffix.

The HP Pavilion TX tablet PC series was sold with AMD processors only, but they still ended with the suffix "z".

HP Imprint
The HP Imprint notebook finish is a high-gloss developed in cooperation with Nissha Printing Co. (Japan). This was used for the following models:

Notebook artwork competitions
HP held a contest in conjunction with MTV to help design a special edition HP notebook case artwork. The contest went from September 5, 2007, to October 17, 2007, and over 8,500 designs from 112 countries were submitted. "Asian Odyssey" by João Oliveira of Porto, Portugal, was chosen as the winner of the competition and featured on the HP dv2800tae Series Notebook. In another competition, “Engine Room”, a design by Hisako Sakihama, from Japan was chosen to appear on a HP notebook.

Specialized features
HP developed Linux based software which could be booted quickly ( 12s ) to play music or DVDs called QuickPlay for the dv series of notebooks, quickplay also incorporated multimedia features, such as pause playback from the included remote control, within Windows. Later versions that shipped with Vista did not have the boot option but retained the multimedia features.

QuickPlay software has been discontinued by HP will be replaced with HP MediaSmart Software that will be installed on all HP Desktops and Notebooks from 2009 onwards.

Overheating issues
Many notebook owners experience hardware failure in various Pavilion models due to overheating. The first symptom is usually a disappearing Wi-Fi. Later failure of the graphics system and booting problems. HP does acknowledge this as a "hardware issue with certain HP Pavilion dv2000/dv6000/dv9000" notebooks, which is eligible for free repair. Other users recommend a "resoldering" of the nVidia GPU on the motherboard due to the overheating causing the solder on the built-in GPU to liquify.

 In 2009, HP had to recall over 70,000 batteries that were defective as a result of overheating.

References

External links
HP corporate homepage

Pavilion
Pavilion
2-in-1 PCs
Consumer electronics brands
Computer-related introductions in 1995